Father Victor Gnanapragasam O.M.I. (21 November 1940 – 12 December 2020) was the first prefect of the Catholic Apostolic Prefecture of Quetta, Balochistan, Pakistan.

Early life and education
He was born in Jaffna, Sri Lanka to Sri Lankan Tamil family. He completed his novitiate with the Missionary Oblates of Mary Immaculate in Kaluthara (1959), then the studies of philosophy and theology at Our Lady of Sri Lanka Seminary in Kandy (1960–1966).

Priesthood
He took his final vows and was ordained a priest on December 21, 1966. He has served in Pakistan as a priest since 1973 and is a member of the Oblates of Mary Immaculate, Pakistan.

He has been a parish priest in Gojra, Diocese of Faisalabad, from 1976-77.  He attended a training course in Youth Ministry in Manila, Philippines from 1977-1979. He was parish priest in Toba Tek Singh, Diocese of Faisalabad from 1978-1980. He was parish priest at Khanewal, Diocese of Multan, from 1979–1985; Superior of the OMI Delegation in Pakistan, 1980–1982 and again parish priest in Gojra from 1982-1986.  He was once again parish priest in Toba Tek Singh from 1987–1989; undertook studies in Psychology and Spirituality at St. Anselm Institute in Kent, England and then later courses in Spirituality at the Angelicum, Rome, 1989-1992. He was parish priest in Gojra for a third time from 1992–1993; Assistant in the formation house of the Oblates in Karachi, 1993–1997 and First Counselor of the OMI Delegation in Pakistan from 1997-2001.

He was appointed to the post of Apostolic Prefect Of Quetta in December 2001.

Fr. Victor was also at the Vatican for the Ad limina Apostolorum visit of the Pakistani Bishops in June 2008.

On 29 April 2010 Pope Benedict XVI elevated the apostolic prefecture of Quetta, to the rank of Apostolic vicariate, with the same name and territorial configuration as before. He appointed Fr. Victor as apostolic vicar of the new ecclesiastical circumscription and the titular bishop of Timida.

Consecration
He was consecrated Bishop at Saint Patrick's Cathedral, Karachi on 16 July 2010 by the apostolic nuncio to Pakistan Archbishop Adolfo Tito Yllana. The Principal Co-Consecrators were Archbishop Evarist Pinto of Karachi and Bishop Max John Rodrigues of Hyderabad.

Current events
Heightened security following unrest in Balochistan has resulted in logistical problems for Gnanapragasam in 2019. His cathedral is in the same area as the army barracks and so he requires a special pass to travel to and fro. This is further exacerbated by frequent police/army checks. The prime minister of Pakistan Imran Khan has said that his government will look into “the plight of the oppressed and weakest segments of the society, including minorities.”

Death
He died on December 12, 2020, because of a heart attack.
The funeral of Bishop Gnanapragasam took place at Holy Rosary Cathedral, Quetta on December 15, 2020. The funeral service was led by Cardinal Joseph Coutts accompanied by all the bishops of Pakistan. He was buried in the garden of the Cathedral.

On January 1, 2021, Pope Francis named Father Khalid Rehmat OFM (Cap.) of the Archdiocese of Lahore as the new vicar apostolic of Quetta.

References

External links
 

1940 births
2020 deaths
21st-century Roman Catholic bishops in Pakistan
People from Jaffna
Sri Lankan Tamil priests
Pakistani people of Sri Lankan Tamil descent
Sri Lankan emigrants to Pakistan
Roman Catholic missionaries in Pakistan
Apostolic vicars of Quetta
Missionary Oblates of Mary Immaculate